The Legislative Library of Uruguay was established in 1929 after the fusion of the libraries of the Senate and that of the House of Representatives.

It is housed in the Legislative Palace, Montevideo and is second in importance to the National Library of Uruguay.

References

External links 

 Biblioteca del Poder Legislativo de Uruguay 

Government agencies established in 1929
1929 establishments in Uruguay
Libraries established in 1929
Libraries in Uruguay
Legislative libraries
Government of Uruguay
Aguada, Montevideo